As You Please may refer to:

"As You Please", by Raymond Lefèvre from Pebble Mill at One
As You Please, album by Citizen (band) 2017